Himzo Polovina (11 March 1927 – 5 August 1986) was a Bosnian singer and songwriter, and one of the most famous and widely revered folk and sevdalinka artists in the region. In addition, Dr. Himzo Polovina was a neuropsychiatrist by profession. His approach contributed to sevdalinka promotion as well as its recognition as authentic music heritage of the Bosniaks.

Early life and career beginnings
Polovina was born on 11 March 1927 in Mostar, Bosnia and Herzegovina. His father, Mušan Polovina, was an Austro-Hungarian soldier during World War I. During his service in Ljubljana, he met and married Ivanka Hlebec, making Himzo Polovina the child of an ethnically mixed marriage between a Bosniak father and a Slovene mother.

Himzo was introduced to music and singing as a young child. His father played the šargija and would often sing sevdalinka songs. As their father sang, Himzo and his siblings sang along in unison.

In the late 1930s, right before World War II broke out, Polovina was taught to play the violin by renowned Czech professor and violinist Karel Malaček.

From 1947 until he left for Sarajevo, he was a member of the folk ensemble "Abrašević", with whom he toured cities and villages across Yugoslavia. He loved the "richness" of the Bosnian national costume, and wore it every time he performed.

While he was a student of medical school in 1950, he was a member of the student cultural club "Slobodan Princip – Seljo" and performed with several other cultural clubs. During this, he successfully completed medical school and became a psychiatrist. In practice, he successfully applied methods of psychiatry, socio-therapy and music therapy. He continued to work in his profession even after becoming a successful singer. Polovina was a respected doctor in the Jagomir mental rehabilitation hospital in Sarajevo until his death.

Career
In January 1953, his medical colleagues persuaded him to audition live for Radio Sarajevo. He performed the sevdalinka song "Mehmeda je stara majka karala", despite the fact that he had a speech impediment which made it difficult for him to pronounce the letter "r." He was admitted and received excellent feedback from skilled musical artists. He was considered more of a sevdah researcher than singer/performer.

He frequently performed at gala concerts for charity, in hospitals, for pensioners, for the decrepit, the elderly and for children in orphanages.

At one point in his career, Polovina went on a five-year hiatus from Radio Sarajevo, due to disagreements with the heads of that company. The matter was resolved and he continued performing.

During his three-decade long career, he performed in virtually every city in Bosnia and Herzegovina.

Emina
His cover of the Bosnian sevdalinka, Emina, is considered by many to be the best version of the song. His 1960s version featured added verses, which were written after the subject of the song, Emina Sefić, died in 1967. Upon hearing Emina's death, Polovina went to poet Sevda Katica's home in the Mostar neighborhood of Donja Mahala. He found her in the yard of the family home, informed her of Emina's death and she shuddered with grief and spoke the verses:

Personal life and death
Polovina was married to a woman named Fikreta Medošević. They had a daughter Rubina and a son Edmir.

He died at the age of 59 from a heart attack while on vacation with his family in Montenegro. According to his brother Mirza, the final song Himzo sang was Emina, shortly before his sudden death.

Himzo Polovina was buried in the Bare Cemetery in Sarajevo.

Discography
The following is the complete list of albums, singles and extended plays (EPs) released by Himzo Polovina:

References

1927 births
1986 deaths
Musicians from Mostar
Yugoslav Muslims
Yugoslav male singers
Sevdalinka
Bosnia and Herzegovina people of Slovenian descent